Apadana is a large hypostyle hall in Persepolis, Iran. It belongs to the oldest building phase of the city of Persepolis, in the first half of the 6th century BC, as part of the original design by Darius the Great. Its construction was completed by Xerxes I. Modern scholarship "demonstrates the metaphorical nature of the Apadana reliefs as idealised social orders".

Etymology
As a word,  (Old Persian 𐎠𐎱𐎭𐎠𐎴, masc.) is used to designate a hypostyle hall, i.e., a palace or audience hall of stone construction with columns. The word is rendered in Elamite as ha-ha-da-na and in Babylonian ap-pa-da-an is etymologically ambiguous. It has been compared to the Sanskrit  (आपादन) which means 'to arrive at', and also to the Sanskrit apa-dhā (अपधा) which means "a hide-out or concealment", and the Greek , meaning "storehouse". The word survived into later periods in Iran, as the Parthian 'pdn(y) or 'pdnk(y) "palace", and outside Iran it still survives in several languages as loan-words (including the Arabic  (transliteration: fadan) for "palace" and the Armenian aparan-kʿ for "palace".)

More precisely, however, this word is the direct ancestor of the medieval and modern architectural term, ayvan/aywan. The Old Persian term 𐎠𐎱𐎭𐎠𐎴, a-pad-an, standing for "unprotected", refers to the fact that the veranda-shaped structure is open to the outside elements on one of its four sides, and thus 'unprotected' / exposed to the natural elements. This is exactly what the Apadana palace has: open (columned) verandas on three sides—a unique feature among all palace buildings at Persepolis. The Parthian and Sasanian architects largely did away with the columns holding up the ceiling of the veranda, replacing them with a barrel vaulting, such as the famous Ayvan of Kisra at Ctesiphon. The later evolution of term into aywan in the post-Islamic architecture that evolved from the old , refers to both columned (such as the palace of Chehel Sotoun, Isfahan) or barrel vaulted (all the four-aywaned mosques). Like the old Apadana, the new aywans are also verandas: open to the natural elements on one side.

As a modern architectural and archaeological term, the word apadana is also used to refer to Urartian hypostyle halls, such as those excavated at Altintepe and Erebuni. These halls predate those from Persia, and it has been proposed that Urartu could be the stylistic origin of the later Persian hypostyle audience halls.

Apadana Palace in Susa 
The Apadana Palace in Susa was built during the reign of Darius around 521 to 515 BC and by his order on the Elamite relics in Susa. The walls of this palace are made of clay with a brick facade and its columns are made of stone. Its inner walls were covered with glazed bricks and featured soldiers of the Eternal Guard, a winged lion, and a lotus flower.Important parts of the  Apadana Palace caught fire during the reign of Artaxerxes I (461 BC) and were rebuilt during the reign of Artaxerxes II (359 BC).

Description

The Apadana was the largest building on the Terrace at Persepolis and was excavated by the German archaeologist Ernst Herzfeld and his assistant Friedrich Krefter, and Erich Schmidt, between 1931 and 1939. Important material relevant to the excavations are today housed in the archives of the Freer Gallery of Art in Washington, DC.

It was most likely the main hall of the kings.  The columns reached 20m high and had complex capitals in the shape of bulls or lions. Here, the great king received the tribute from all the nations in the Achaemenid Empire and gave presents in return.

Access to the hall is given by two monumental stairways, on the north and on the east. These are decorated by reliefs, showing delegates of the 23 subject nations of the Persian Empire paying tribute to Darius I, who is represented seated centrally. The various delegates are shown in great detail, giving insight into the costume and equipment of the various peoples of Persia in the 5th century BC. There are inscriptions in Old Persian and Elamite.

Measurements

The Apadana at Persepolis has a surface of 1000 square metres; its roof was supported by 72 columns, each 24 metres tall. The entire hall was destroyed in 331 BC by the army of Alexander the Great. Stones from the columns were used as building material for nearby settlements. By the start of the 20th century, only 13 of these giant columns were still standing. The re-erecting of a complete, but fallen column in the 1970s, is now the 14th standing column of the Apadana.

The Apadana in Susa was—like the city itself—largely abandoned, and pillaged for building material.

Legacy
The apadana hall influenced the Umayyad architecture. Early mosques built in Persia and Iraq imitate this structure.

References

Bibliography

External links

Oriental Institute Photographic Archives
The Achaemenians continued
Persepolis3D, a virtual reconstruction of Apadana

Buildings and structures completed in the 5th century BC
Achaemenid architecture
Architecture in Iran
Persepolis